Post-combustion capture refers to the removal of CO2 from power station flue gas prior to its compression, transportation and storage in suitable geological formations, as part of carbon capture and storage. A number of different techniques are applicable, almost all of which are adaptations of acid gas removal processes used in the chemical and petrochemical industries. Many of these techniques existed before World War II and, consequently, post-combustion capture is the most developed of the various carbon-capture methodologies.

Calcium looping is a promising second generation post-combustion capture technology in which calcium oxide, often referred to as the sorbent, is used to separate CO2 from the flue gas. The ANICA project focuses on developing a novel indirectly heated carbonate lopping process for lowering the energy penalty and CO2 avoidance costs for CO2 capture from lime and cement plants.

See also 
 Acid gas
 Carbon capture and storage

References

External links 
 http://www3.imperial.ac.uk/carboncaptureandstorage

Combustion
Chemical processes